The following highways are numbered 961:

United States